Bahawalnagar Tehsil is a tehsil located in Bahawalnagar District, Punjab, Pakistan. There are two towns in Bahawalnagar Tehsil: Bahawalnagar and Dunga Bunga. The city of Bahawalnagar is the headquarters of the tehsil which is administratively subdivided into 31 Union Councils.

History
Bahawalnagar Tehsil was given the status of Tehsil Municipal Administration (TMA) after the implementation of the Punjab Local Government Ordinance 2001.

Geography

Bahawalnagar Tehsil has an area of 1,729 km2.

Adjacent tehsils
Arif Wala Tehsil, Pakpattan District (north)
Pakpattan Tehsil, Pakpattan District (north)
Minchinabad Tehsil (northeast)
Karanpur Tehsil, Sri Ganganagar District, Rajasthan, India (east)
Raisinghnagar Tehsil, Sri Ganganagar District, Rajasthan, India (southeast)
Haroonabad Tehsil (southwest)
Chishtian Tehsil (west)
Burewala Tehsil, Vehari District (northwest)

Demographics

According to the 2017 Census of Pakistan, Bahawalnagar Tehsil has a total population of 815,143 (133,106 households), with 621,101 people (101,148 households) residing in rural areas and 194,042 people (31,958 households) residing in urban areas.

The population recorded in the 1998 Census of Pakistan was 541,553.

Governance

In February 2015, an action by Bahawalnagar TMA imposed commercial fees on buildings, prompting protests from local students and teachers due to the sealing of seven schools which could not afford to comply with TMA notices.

In March 2018, residents protested Bahawalnagar TMA's decision to give a politically backed factory owner authority over the local water supply.

Economy

Major industries in the tehsil include cotton ginning & pressing, flour mills, marble, oil milles, paper & paper board, rice mills, sugar, tea blending, and textile spinning.

Infrastructure

The Punjab Municipal Development Fund Company made an agreement with the Bahawalnagar TMA for the construction of a landfill site in 2008. Nine acres and three kanals were acquired at Mauza Musa Bhota for the site, and the project was inaugurated by Chief Minister Shahbaz Sharif in October, 2012. The project cost Rs90 million.

Settlements

Municipal Committees
Bahawalnagar
Donga Bonga

See also
List of tehsils of Punjab, Pakistan

References

External links

Bahawalnagar District
Tehsils of Punjab, Pakistan